Archambault is a Media company in Quebec, Canada.

Archambault may also refer to:

 Archambault (surname), includes a list of people with the name.
 Bourbon-l'Archambault, spa town and a commune in the Allier department in Auvergne in central France
 Bourg-Archambault, commune of the Vienne département, in France
 Canton of Bourbon-l'Archambault, administrative division in central France
 Archambault Ridge, Victoria Land, Antarctica
 Archambault report, influential study of the penitentiary system in Canada that was tabled in 1938
 Archambault House, historic house in Florissant, Missouri, U.S.

See also
 Archambeault, surname
 Sarh (formally Fort Archambault), capital of Moyen-Chari Region, Chad